Chim Chim's Badass Revenge is the fifth full-length album  and concept album from alternative rock band Fishbone. It was Fishbone's first studio album in three years following the departure of founding members Kendall Jones and Chris Dowd and the band being dropped by Sony Records. It was also their last album with founding member Philip "Fish" Fisher, who would eventually leave the band two years later.

The band's recent experiences prompted the album's themes of racism and music industry practices, and Chim Chim's Badass Revenge includes some of the band's heaviest songs, such as the hardcore punk title track, "Riot" and "Psychologically Overcast" (the latter featuring guest vocals by Busta Rhymes). The album was produced by Dallas Austin, who said he wanted to take Fishbone to the next level as Rick Rubin had done with Red Hot Chili Peppers. In 1997, Austin would use Fishbone as the backing band for Amoeba Cleansing Syndrome, the second album by R&B singer Joi Gilliam.

The Familyhood (Fishbone's Fans) have often also criticized the album for being poorly mixed both levelly and sonically. John  Bigham, who'd joined the band during the tour for The Reality of My Surroundings makes his only solo guitar effort on this album, leaving shortly after the completion due to what was cited as "lack of creative input" and wanting to create a solo career.

It has been heard that most of the lyrics for the entire album were in fact written by Walter Kibby. The song "Alcoholic" was written by Angelo Moore in his teenage years and was inspired by his uncle before the band was signed to Sony Records and appears on their original demo submitted to record labels. It was often live introduced by Angelo Moore as "a song I wrote about my uncle... he's an alcoholic, and he makes me really mad... "

The album sold well in underground circles but only reached #158 on the Billboard Album Charts. It was the last Fishbone album for four years, as the band went through more personnel changes.

Track listing
All songs written by Fishbone, except for "Chim Chim's Badass Revenge" and "Pre Nutt", which were written by Fishbone and executive producer Dallas Austin.

Personnel
Fishbone
Angelo Moore - saxophone, theremin, vocals
Walter A. Kibby II - trumpet, vocals
John Bigham - guitar, keyboards
John Norwood Fisher - bass guitar, vocals
Philip "Fish" Fisher - drums
Additional
Janna, Jeanette, John Nelson, Joi Gilliam, Mary Harris, Screechy Peach, N'Dea Davenport, Taree, Tirunji, Trina Mead -  background vocals

Album Cover Art/Illustrations Ronald Stozo/R.Toons

Charts
Album - Billboard (North America)

References

Fishbone albums
1996 albums